The Xiang’er (also Hsiang-erh; Simplified Chinese: 想尔, Traditional Chinese: 想爾) is a commentary to the Dao De Jing that is best known for being one of the earliest surviving texts from the Way of the Celestial Master variant of Daoism. The meaning of the title "Xiang’er" is debated, but can be translated as meaning ‘thinking of you.’

History
The Xiang’er was likely written between 190 and 220 AD, a time when the Celestial Masters controlled a theocratic state in Sichuan. Early sources indicate that the text was written by Zhang Lu, the third Celestial Master and grandson to Zhang Daoling.

The text available to us today was discovered in the Buddhist caves at Dunhuang in the early 20th century and was part of the trove that traveled to London along with Aurel Stein. However, the Xiang’er that survives only comments upon 3d through 37th chapters of the Daode Jing. Presumably there was also a second part of the Xiang’er, but it has now been lost. The Xiang’er text found at Dunhuang likely dates from the 5th or 6th centuries.

Precepts
The Xiang’er reveals a great deal about early Celestial Master thought and practice. In particular, the text offers advice to individuals and to society as a whole.

In terms of individual advice, the Xiang’er, like the rest of Daoism, discusses ways in which a person could gain immortality. According to the Xiang’er, the body was inhabited by spirits that survive in the presence of qi. In order to attain immortality, a person had to preserve and nourish these internal spirits. Presumably these spirits could be nurtured through meditation, but the Xiang’er offers very little guidance on what type of meditation one should do. The Xiang’er also looks down upon Daoist sexual practices, and urges its readers not to practice them.

While aimed at a wide audience, the Xiang’er also contains advice that could be used for rulers. These rulers were encouraged to remake society on the model of the Dao. Such a society would not be based on desire for wealth and fame, but on the fear and the respect of heaven. Hopefully when people learn to be respectful and fearful towards heaven, they will act morally.

References

 Bokenkamp, Stephen. Early Daoist Scriptures. Berkeley: University of California, 1999.
 Michael Puett, “Becoming Laozi: Cultivating and Visualizing Spirits in Early Medieval China”. Asia Major, Third series. 2010;23(1):223-252. 
 Rao Zongyi 饒宗頤, Laozi Xiang’er zhu jiaojian 老子想爾注校牋 (Shanghai: Guji chubanshe, 1991);
 
 The text of Xiang'er (Traditional Chinese), (Simplified Chinese).

Taoist texts
Way of the Celestial Masters